Yeh Kaisi Mohabbat is a 2002 Hindi musical drama romance cum thriller movie directed by Dinkar Kapur. It featured Krishna Abhishek, Deeksha, Sharad Kapoor, Deepak Tijori, Viveka Babajee, and Mukesh Rishi in pivotal roles. Actress Deeksha was cast as a replacement for Sakshi Shivanand.

Plot 
Vicky is a happy go lucky boy. He is always in search of a rich girlfriend. Vicky lives in a motor garage with his friends. One day, he falls in love with a girl, Tina. Vicky represent himself as a rich man and begins a romance with Tina. On another occasion, he rescues a wealthy man, Rahul Thakral, from a few assassins. Rahul thanks Vicky and offers him a job. The job is to spy on his wife Priya. Vicky is shocked to see that Priya is Tina's look-alike. Priya realises that Vicky is spying on her; she befriends and tries to seduce him. In a birthday celebration for Priya, Vicky goes to Thakral's home. When Priya goes indoors, Vicky hears a scream and enters, finding the dead body of Priya. He panics and runs away, but investigating ACP are on the lookout for him. Vicky's friends tell the police of his whereabouts, and he is arrested. He gets to attend the funeral for Priya and forces them to open the coffin, only to find that the woman inside is not Tina's look-alike Priya, but someone else.

Cast 
Krishna Abhishek as Vicky
Deeksha as Tina / Priya
Sharad Kapoor as Rahul
Viveka Babajee as Priya Thakral
Deepak Tijori 
Mukesh Rishi

Soundtrack 
Music composed by Sandeep Chowta.
"Akeli Hai Raat" - Alka Yagnik
"Din Jawani Ke Char Char" - Sunidhi Chauhan
"Jhol Jhol" - Sonu Nigam
"Main Hoon Akela" - Sukhwinder Singh
"Mere Khuda Tu" - Alka Yagnik
"Pyar Hai Tumse" - Shaan, K. S. Chitra
"Yeh Kaisi Mohabbat" - Kumar Sanu, Alka Yagnik

References

External links 

2002 films
2000s Hindi-language films
2002 romantic drama films
Indian romantic musical films
Films scored by Nitin Raikwar
2000s romantic musical films